Profil was a band that represented France in Eurovision Song Contest 1980 with the entry Hè Hé M'sieurs dames (11th place, 45 pts). The band members were: Martine Havet, Martine Bauer, Francis Rignault, Jean-Claude Corbel and Jean-Pierre Izbinski.

External links 

 Lyrics of entry Hè Hé M´sieurs dames, in french and english.

French musical groups
Eurovision Song Contest entrants for France
Eurovision Song Contest entrants of 1980